The 2007 Asian Women's Junior Handball Championship (9th tournament) took place in Almaty from 1 July–7 July. It acts as the Asian qualifying tournament for the 2008 Women's Junior World Handball Championship.

Draw

Preliminary round

Group A

Group B

Placement 5th/6th

Final round

Semifinals

Bronze medal match

Gold medal match

Final standing

References
www.handball.jp (Archived 2009-09-04)

External links
www.asianhandball.com

International handball competitions hosted by Kazakhstan
Asian Women's Junior Handball Championship, 2007
Asia
Asian Handball Championships